"Used to Blue" is a song written by J. Fred Knobloch and Bill LaBounty, and recorded by American country music group Sawyer Brown.  It was released in May 1985 as the third single from their self-titled debut album.  It peaked at number 3 on the U.S. Billboard Hot Country Songs chart and it became their second number-one hit on the Canadian RPM country singles chart.

Charts

Weekly charts

Year-end charts

References

1985 singles
Sawyer Brown songs
Songs written by Bill LaBounty
Songs written by J. Fred Knobloch
Capitol Records Nashville singles
Curb Records singles
1984 songs